The Mediterranean Basketball Association (MBA), was a proposed international basketball competition between Eurasian professional basketball leagues, mainly centered on the Mediterranean Sea region. The proposed league was slated to have between 16 teams, from 8 different countries, from both Europe and Asia, in its inaugural season. Countries with teams that were slated to participate in the proposed league's inaugural season included: Bulgaria, Cyprus, Greece, Lebanon, Serbia, Turkey, Israel, and Qatar. There were also plans to include teams from Italy in the competition.

Al Jazeera expressed the desire to obtain broadcast rights for the league. Ultimately, the league was never formed.

Format
The proposed league was backed and sponsored by a group of wealthy investors from Qatar, by the Hellenic Basketball Federation, by FIBA Asia, and by some of the biggest and richest basketball clubs in Europe and Asia, as well as the sponsors of those clubs. Such as Panathinaikos Athens, Olympiacos Piraeus, Fenerbahçe Ülker İstanbul, Efes Pilsen İstanbul, and Maccabi Tel Aviv. The proposed league would have been governed by the Hellenic Basketball Federation and FIBA Asia, and commissioned by George Vassilakopoulos, the former head of FIBA Europe, and by Sheikh Saud Bin Ali Al-Thani, the head of FIBA Asia.

The proposed league was slated to opt for a promotion and relegation model, and with the participating teams only playing in their national domestic leagues at the playoff stage, and still playing in their national domestic cup competitions. This format was modeled after the ABA Adriatic League. League operations were originally proposed to begin in October 2011, but the league never materialized.

Proposed team allocation

References

External links
Talkbasket.net Mediterranean League Article 1
Talkbasket.net Mediterranean League Article 2
WABSports.com Mediterranean League Article
The Hoop  Mediterranean League Article
Spor3.com Mediterranean League Article 
Calcalist Mediterranean League Article 
Superbasket.gr Mediterranean League Article 

Multi-national basketball leagues in Europe
Basketball leagues in Asia
Proposed sports leagues